Muriel Robertson ,  (8 April 1883 – 14 June 1973) was a Scottish protozoologist and bacteriologist at the Lister Institute, London from 1915 to 1961. She made key discoveries of the life cycle of trypanosomes.

Early life and education
Robertson was born in Glasgow, the seventh of 12 children of Elizabeth Ritter and her husband, engineer Robert Andrew Robertson. She was educated privately and then attended the University of Glasgow where she obtained a Master of Arts in 1905. She worked for two years in Glasgow after graduating. An early project was a study of Pseudospora volvocis, a protozoan parasite of the alga Volvox.

Career
In 1907 she was awarded a Carnegie Fellowship and moved to Ceylon to study trypanosome infections in reptiles. She then joined the staff at the Lister Institute in London under Professor Edward Alfred Minchin from 1910 to 1911. She spent time as protozoologist to what was then the Uganda Protectorate from 1911 to 1914 where she researched the lifecycle of Trypanosoma gambiense (which causes African trypanosomiasis or sleeping sickness) in blood and in its insect carrier, the tsetse fly, publishing her ground-breaking results. She is claimed to have bicycled through the forests of Uganda on this work, according to her Obituary. In 1923 she obtained her Doctor of Science from the University of Glasgow for a thesis entitled A study of the life histories of certain trypanosomes.

On the creation of the Tropical Medical Research Committee by the Medical Research Council in 1936, Robertson was amongst the first of those elected to the Committee.

Robertson returned to the Lister Institute in 1914 shortly before World War I. Except for a period at the Institute of Animal Pathology in Cambridge during the Second World War, she worked at the Lister Institute until 1961. Most of her work was as a protozoologist, but she worked on bacteriology during both world wars, and in particular on anaerobic Clostridia infection of war wounds, the cause of gas-gangrene.

She was elected a Fellow of the Royal Society in 1947, in the same year as Dorothy Hodgkin, and only two years after the first women, Marjory Stephenson and Kathleen Lonsdale, were elected. The following year, she became an Honorary Doctor of Law (LLD) at the University of Glasgow. She was also a fellow of the Royal Society of Tropical Medicine and of the Institute of Biology, and a member of the Pathological Society, the Society for Experimental Biology and the Medical Research Club. She was a founder of the Society of General Microbiology and served on its council from 1945 to 1948.

After officially retiring in 1948, Robertson continued to work, sponsored by the Agricultural Research Council, teaching her skills to research workers at the Lister Institute until 1961. She suffered from acute glaucoma in the 1950s and one eye was removed. She continued work in Cambridge for a short period before finally retiring to the family estate in Limavady in Northern Ireland. After a period of illness, she died at Altnagelvin Area Hospital in Derry on 14 June 1973.

See also
Protistology

References

Alumni of the University of Glasgow
Scottish women scientists
Female Fellows of the Royal Society
Scottish biologists
1883 births
1973 deaths
Scientists from Glasgow
Fellows of the Royal Society
20th-century British women scientists
20th-century biologists